Fujiwara no Nagako ( – after 1119) was a servant of two Japanese tennōs of the Heian period. She became famous as the author of a nikki bungaku.

Career 
She became famous under the two notnames of Sanuki Tenji (Court lady of the Sanuki Province) and Sanuki no Suke (Assistant from Sanuki). This described her position as a servant in the court of the emperors Horikawa (1087–1107) and Toba (1107–1123). At that time, she wrote a nikki bungaku, a literary but quotidian diary, intended to educate other readers. Typical for the genre, her identity was not revealed. In 1929 Tamai Kosuke identified the person behind Sanuki Tenji as Nagako from the Fujiwara family.

Fujiwara no Nagako was thought to be the youngest daughter of provincial administrator Fujiwara no Akitsuna, who was an important figure at court. Nagako served for eight years as the second-ranked female servant in the Horikawa court, who was likely her age. She may have been a concubine. Her older sister had been Horikawa's wet nurse, and entered a monastery while grieving his death in 1107. Nagako continued serving Horikawa's successor Tenno with dampened enthusiasm. She served Toba for another twelve years until the new emperor neared adulthood. In 1119, she was pushed away from Toba: It was variously reported that she became maniacal, developed delusions of seeing Horikawa, and uttered prophecies. An alternative reason would be allegations of lacking discretion. Her removal from court ended her presence in historical records; her date of death is not known.

Two courtiers have been alleged to be her husband.

She has been characterized as a modest and educated woman in a comparatively liberal century.

Work 
Sanuki no Suke Nikki consists of two extant volumes. The 31 historical copies of her manuscript differ. It is presumed that copyists of later eras modified the text. For example, passages may have been influenced by Buddhist beliefs contemporary to the copyists. A third volume, set between the other two has been hypothesized.

Sanuki Tenji contains detailed observations on contemporary lifestyles, especially of the tenno and his court. Among them are Shintoistic rituals as well as the monarch's leisure activities. The very positive point of view of Sanuki Tenji is almost the only extant record.

The first volume briefly recounts service in Horikawa's court; the second volume reflects much more time and literary freedom. The second volume includes 23 poems, several of them citations of other poets, but most of them proving Nagako's aptitude in poetry. The second volume stops abruptly at the beginning of 1109; the closing lines were written by a different author.

References

Further reading 
 Marina Grey: "Sanuki Tenji". In: Die Berühmten Frauen der Welt von A-Z; German translation of the French original by Jean-François Chiappe: Le monde au féminin – Encyclopédie des femmes célèbres, Éditions Aimery Somogny, Paris, 1970s.
 Kusakabe, Ryōen: 讃岐典待日記 : 研究と解釈. Tōkyō, Kasama Shoin, Shōwa 52 (1977). Catalog Entry

Japanese writers of the Heian period
12th-century Japanese writers
12th-century Japanese women writers